Thermoanaerobacterium thermosaccharolyticum, previously known as Clostridium thermosaccharolyticum, is a bacterium belonging to the Bacillota. It is an anaerobic, motile, gram-positive bacterium.

See also
Thermoanaerobacterium aotearoense

References

Bibliography

External links
Type strain of Thermoanaerobacterium thermosaccharolyticum at BacDive -  the Bacterial Diversity Metadatabase

Thermoanaerobacterales
Thermophiles
Anaerobes
Bacteria described in 1994